Hazenland or Hazen Land is an uninhabited island of the Lincoln Sea in Peary Land, far northern Greenland.

The island was named in May 1882 by James Booth Lockwood of the Lady Franklin Bay Expedition after General William Babcock Hazen, who had organized the venture. Lockwood reached his farthest north (83° 24′N) on neighboring Lockwood Island.

Geography
Hazenland is located off the eastern side of East Jensen Island in the De Long Fjord zone.

Its eastern shore forms the western side of Weyprecht Fjord, beyond which lies Lockwood Island. Wild Sound extends off the southwestern shore and MacMillan Island rises beyond it. Moa Island lies to the southeast at the mouth of Harder Fjord, separated from Hazenland's shore by a narrow sound.

See also
List of islands of Greenland

References

Uninhabited islands of Greenland

ceb:Hazen Land
sv:Hazen Land (ö i Grönland)